Core & Main Inc., headquartered in St. Louis, Missouri, is a U.S. distributor of water, sewer and fire protection products.

History 
On 1 August 2017, Clayton, Dubilier & Rice acquired the Waterworks division of HD Supply  and changed its name to Core & Main.  Goldman Sachs & Co, LLC served as financial advisor and King & Spalding served as legal counsel to HD Supply on the transaction. SEC filings from December 2014 show that The Carlyle Group and Clayton, Dubilier, & Rice had sold off their holdings of HD Supply 3 years before this purchase of the Waterworks division.

Acquisitions

References 

Companies based in St. Louis